Oenanthe (which means wineflower - from οἶνος wine and ἄνθος flower), who flourished in the 3rd century BC and died in 203 BC, was an Egyptian Greek noblewoman who, through marriage, was a relation of the Ptolemaic dynasty.

She was a woman of obscure origins. She had married (at an unknown date) Agathocles, an Egyptian Greek nobleman, the grandson of Agathocles of Syracuse the late Greek Tyrant of Syracuse, who later became King of Sicilyand Theoxena of Syracuse, a Greek Macedonian noblewoman, who was the second older maternal half-sister of the Greek Egyptian Pharaoh Ptolemy II Philadelphus. Oenanthe bore Agathocles four children who were: one son, Agathocles of Egypt; one daughter, called Agathoclea, and another two daughters whose names are unknown.

Agathocles died at an unknown date. Oenanthe later remarried to Theogenes, sometimes known as Theognetos or Diognetos. Theogenes was a prominent Egyptian Greek who was a dioiketes a manager of a private estate. 

Oenanthe was an ambitious and avaricious character. She introduced Agathoclea and Agathocles to the Egyptian Greek Pharaoh Ptolemy IV Philopator, who reigned from 221 BC to 205 BC. Through her children she was able to possess the greatest influence over the government in the reign of Ptolemy IV. Agathoclea became the favourite mistress of Ptolemy IV and, later, Agathocles became the regent and guardian of Ptolemy IV’s child, Ptolemy V Epiphanes. 

Oenanthe’s influence only lasted until Ptolemy IV died. In 205 BC, after the accession of the young Ptolemy V, the citizens of Alexandria rose up against Oenanthe, her family and their party, who fled for refuge to the temple of the Thesmophorium. They hoped the aid of the goddesses and their enchantments would drive away the threats and curses. Some noble ladies had come to console her. 

The next day Oenanthe, her family and their party, were dragged out from the altar by the Alexandrians and brought naked on horse-back to the stadium, where they were all murdered, being torn into pieces.

References

Sources
 Ancient Library article: Agathoclea
 Ancient Library article: Oenanthe
 Ptolemaic Genealogy: Agathoclea 
 Ptolemaic Dynasty - Affiliated Lines: Agathocles 
 Ptolemaic Genealogy: Berenice I
 Ptolemaic Genealogy: Theoxena

3rd-century BC Greek people
Ptolemaic dynasty
Ancient Alexandrians
Ptolemaic court
3rd-century BC Egyptian people
Lynching deaths